Natham is a taluka in Dindigul district in the Madurai Region in the Indian state of Tamil Nadu.

Demographics
 India census, Natham had a population of 22,533. Males constitute 50% of the population and females 50%. Natham has an average literacy rate of 40%, lesser than the national average of 59.5%: male literacy is 36%, and female literacy is 46%. In Natham, 12% of the population is under 6 years of age.

References

Cities and towns in Dindigul district